The discography of Little Birdy, an Australian indie rock band, consists of three studio albums, two EPs, and twelve singles.

Studio albums

EPs

Singles

Collaborations 
 "Where Did I Go Wrong?" (2009) - Rosie Catalano featuring Little Birdy

References 

Discographies of Australian artists
Rock music group discographies